Stillingia tenella is a species of flowering plant in the spurge family, Euphorbiaceae. It was originally described as Sapium tenellum Pax & K.Hoffm. in 1924. It is native to Bolivia and northwest Argentina.

References

tenella
Plants described in 1924
Flora of Bolivia
Flora of Argentina